Brandon Michael Barden (born March 15, 1989) is an American football tight end who is currently a free agent. He was originally signed by the Tennessee Titans as an undrafted free agent in 2012. He played college football at Vanderbilt University.

Professional career

Tennessee Titans
After going undrafted, Barden was signed as an undrafted free agent by the Tennessee Titans.

Jacksonville Jaguars
Barden was signed to the Jacksonville Jaguars practice squad on November 19, 2013. He was signed to the active roster at the conclusion of the 2013 regular season. The Jaguars released Barden on August 29, 2014.

Kansas City Chiefs
Barden was signed to the Kansas City Chiefs practice squad on October 14, 2014. On December 31, he signed a futures contract with the Chiefs.

Dallas Cowboys
On August 4, 2015, the Dallas Cowboys signed Barden. On September 1, 2015, he was released by the Cowboys.

References

External links
Vanderbilt Commodores bio

1989 births
Living people
People from Lincolnton, Georgia
Players of American football from Georgia (U.S. state)
American football tight ends
Vanderbilt Commodores football players
Tennessee Titans players
Jacksonville Jaguars players